Mike Butt (born 6 May 1995) is a  international rugby league footballer who plays as a er and  for the Swinton Lions in the Betfred Championship.

Background
Butt was born in Manchester, Greater Manchester, England. He is of Welsh descent through his grandmother. 

He attended Manchester Metropolitan University and played rugby league for England Universities.

Club career
In May 2015 Butt made his Swinton début against the Keighley Cougars.

He was given the Young Player of the Year award in 2017, and Player of the Year award in 2018.

Butt was the top Swinton try scorer for both the 2020 and 2021 seasons.

International career
In 2018 Butt made his international début for Wales against Scotland in the 2018 Rugby League European Championship.

Butt played for Wales at the 2019 Rugby League World Cup 9s.

In June 2022 Butt scored his first try at international level, when he crossed the line against France. In October 2022 he was named in the Wales squad for the 2021 Rugby League World Cup.

References

External links
Swinton Lions profile
Wales profile
RLWC 9s profile
Welsh profile

1995 births
Living people
English rugby league players
Rugby league fullbacks
Rugby league players from Manchester
Rugby league wingers
Swinton Lions players
Wales national rugby league team players